Segun Victor Ikudehinbu (born June 16, 1989 in Lagos) is a Nigerian football player currently playing for Kotkan Työväen Palloilijat.

In September 2017, Ikudehinbu was sentenced to two years and two months imprisonment for two counts of rape. Itä-Suomi Court of Appeals upheld the sentence passed previously by Pohjois-Savo District Court. The rapes took place in Kuopio, fall 2015. The defendant denied any wrongdoing and claimed the intercourse was consensual.

References

1989 births
Living people
Sportspeople from Lagos
Nigerian expatriate footballers
Yoruba sportspeople
Veikkausliiga players
Kuopion Palloseura players
Nigerian expatriates in Finland
Expatriate footballers in Finland
Nigerian people convicted of rape
Association football midfielders
CSM Slatina footballers
Nigerian people imprisoned abroad
Prisoners and detainees of Finland
Nigerian footballers